Glenn Aitken (born in New Zealand on 14 December 1970) also known as Glenn Finlay Aitken, is a London-based New Zealand singer-songwriter and multi-instrumentalist.  In 2010, he released his debut studio album entitled Extraordinary Lives.

Career
Glenn Aitken learned piano at an early age and went on to learn guitar and saxophone. He played his music in many countries including China, Malaysia, and Thailand. During one of his tours in the Maldives, he had his big break when Sir Paul McCartney discovered him while holidaying there. Aitken moved to London in 2003 where he is based now.

"The Way", a song composed and performed by Aitken, appeared on a special compilation by Sir Paul McCartney entitled Paul McCartney's Glastonbury Groove. The album contains some of Paul McCartney's favourite songs of 2004 as published in UNCUT magazine and distributed as a free CD with the magazine.

Since coming to England, Aitken has had his music published by MPL Communications, a holding company owned by McCartney. Aitken has also been a finalist in the 2004, 2005, 2006, 2007 and 2010 UK Songwriting Contests. He also won the Roland UK Loopstation Championship in 2008, was runner up in 2009, and finalist in 2010.

Aitken released his début album, Extraordinary Lives, in June 2010. The album produced by John Ravenhall contains 14 tracks, and includes guest artists such as Paul McCartney, Greg Lyons and Strings by the Chicago Symphonic Orchestra.

Platform - the second album was released in July 2013.  It contains 15 tracks.

Discography

Albums
 2010: Extraordinary Lives
 2013:  Platform

Track list: (Extraordinary Lives)
"Ordinary People" (5:32)
"Just No" (3:46)
"Don't Say Never" (4:04)
"The Way" (3:41)
"Little Bird" (3:47)
"Never Find the Right Words" (3:54)
"Warning Signs" (3:10)
"Why Do You Walk on By (Intermission)" (1:23)
"Immortalized" (4:14)
"Underground" (3:38)
"Bundle of Truth" (3:44)
"Define Me" (3:38)
"Something New" (3:33)
"Central Park in Fall" (6:13)

Track list: (Platform)
 "Simple Man" (5:16)
 "Permission To Land" (3:43)
 "Runaway" (3:38)
 "Hold On" (4:56)
 "Fall Down" (3:58)
 "Woman" (2:55)
 "I Am The Man" (3:42)
 "Static" (3:24)
 "Amaze Me" (3:54)
 "CC Eyes" (4:33)
 "Production Line Frankenstein" (4:12)
 "Same Old Song" (4:29)
 "Temporary Noose" (3:32)
 "Overload" (5:22)
 "All This Time" (3:20)

Singles
2010: "Ordinary People"
 2011: "Just No" - Playlisted on BBC Radio 2

Featured
2004: "The Way" appears in Paul McCartney's Glastonbury Groove

References

External links
Glenn Aitken Official website
Glenn Aitken YouTube page
Glenn Aitken Facebook page
Extraordinary Lives website

New Zealand male singer-songwriters
1970 births
Living people
21st-century New Zealand male singers
New Zealand expatriates in England